"Lo Aprendí de Ti" is the second single of the live album Primera Fila: Hecho Realidad by American duo Ha*Ash. The single was officially released on March 6, 2015. The music video of the song is the live performance by Ha*Ash in Estudios Churubusco, Mexico City on 7 July 2014. The song then included on their live album Ha*Ash: En Vivo (2019). It was written by Ashley Grace, Hanna Nicole and José Luis Ortega. The music video, become the first YouTube ballad in Spanish to reach one billion views.

Background and release 
"Lo Aprendí de ti" was written by Ashley Grace, Hanna Nicole and José Luis Ortega and produced by George Noriega, Tim Mitchell and Pablo De La Loza. It was recorded by Ha*Ash for their live album Primera Fila: Hecho Realidad. It was released as the second single from the album on March 6, 2015, by Sony Music Entertainment.

Commercial performance 
The track peaked at number 19 in the Latin Pop Songs, number 32 in the Hot Latin songs and at number 59 in the Latin Airplay charts in the United States. In Mexico, the song peaked at number one on the Mexican Singles Chart and Monitor Latino. In 2017, the song was certified Double Platinum in Mexico. In March 2019, the songs was certified as Triple Platinum in Mexico. On June 24, 2020, the songs was certified as Quadruple Platinum in Mexico.

Music video 
The music video for "Lo Aprendí de Ti" was released on March 6, 2015 and was directed by Nahuel Lerena. The video was filmed in Estudios Churubusco, Mexico City. On September 13, 2020, the music video for "Lo Aprendi de Ti", become the first YouTube ballad in Spanish to reach one billion views. , the video has over 1.0 billion views on YouTube.

The second video for "Lo Aprendí de Ti", recorded live for the live album Ha*Ash: En Vivo, was released on December 6, 2019. The video was filmed in Auditorio Nacional, Mexico City.

Credits and personnel 
Credits adapted from AllMusic.

Recording and management

 Recording Country: Mexico
 Sony / ATV Discos Music Publishing LLC / Westwood Publishing
 (P) 2014 Sony Music Entertainment US Latin LLC

Ha*Ash
 Ashley Grace – vocals, guitar, songwriting
 Hanna Nicole – vocals, guitar, piano, songwriting
Additional personnel
 Ben Peeler;– Guitarra Lap Steel
 Pablo De La Loza – chorus, co-production
 José Luis Ortega – songwriting
 Paul Forat – A&R. programming, production
 Ezequiel Ghilardi – bass
 Gonzalo Herrerias – A&R
 George Noriega – producer
 Tim Mitchell – producer

Charts

Certifications

Awards and nominations

Release history

References 

Ha*Ash songs
Songs written by Ashley Grace
Songs written by Hanna Nicole
Songs written by José Luis Ortega
Song recordings produced by George Noriega
Song recordings produced by Tim Mitchell
2015 singles
2015 songs
Spanish-language songs
Pop ballads
Sony Music Latin singles
2010s ballads
Monitor Latino Top General number-one singles